The  is a subway line in Tokyo, Japan, operated by Tokyo Metro. The line runs in a U-shape between Ogikubo Station in Suginami and Ikebukuro Station in Toshima, with a branch line between Nakano-Sakaue Station and Hōnanchō Station.

The line was named after the Marunouchi business district in Chiyoda, Tokyo, under which it passes. On maps, diagrams and signboards, the line is shown using the color red, and its stations are given numbers using the letters "M" for the main line and "Mb" for the branch line.

Overview
The Marunouchi Line is the second line to be built in the city, and the first one constructed after the Second World War. The route is U-shaped, running from Ogikubo Station in the west of the city via the commercial and administrative district of Shinjuku through to the Marunouchi commercial center around Tokyo Station, before turning back and heading to Ikebukuro. Along with the Ginza Line, it is self-enclosed and does not have any through services with other railway lines.

The Marunouchi Line is served by Tokyo Metro 02 series rolling stock in six-car trains on the main line, and mostly three-car trains on the Hōnanchō branch (some 6 car trains during peak hours). The main line was the most frequent subway line in Tokyo, with trains once running at intervals of 1 minute 50 seconds during peak hours. In spite of such high-frequency service, according to a 2008 survey by the Ministry of Land, Infrastructure, Transport and Tourism the Marunouchi Line is one of the most crowded railway lines in Tokyo, but in the 2018 release, the Marunouchi line is one of the more crowded Metro lines, running at 169% capacity between Shin-ōtsuka and Myōgadani stations. Its age and relatively short train length has made it one of the most crowded lines in Tokyo, although the 2000 opening of the Toei Ōedo Line has relieved the problem somewhat. In response to crowding, Tokyo Metro upgraded all stations with chest-high platform doors on March 28, 2009, a date on which it also began driver-only operation. The Hōnanchō branch switched to driver-only operation in July 2004.

Due to the age of the Marunouchi Line and the relative shallowness at which it runs, at several points in central Tokyo trains run at or above ground level. These include Yotsuya Station, the Kanda River near Ochanomizu Station (see image), and between Kōrakuen and Myōgadani stations.

On maps, diagrams and signboards, the line is shown using the color red. Its stations are given numbers using the prefix "M"; Hōnanchō branch line stations carry the prefix "Mb", which replaced the previously used lowercase "m" prefix in November 2016.

Station list 
 All stations are located in Tokyo.
 Some trains leave the main line at Nakano-sakaue (M-06) for the Marunouchi Branch Line to Hōnanchō.

Main Line

Branch Line (Honancho Line)

Rolling stock

Marunouchi Line services are operated using a fleet of 53 Tokyo Metro 02 series six-car EMUs in service since 1988 together with six three-car sets used on Hōnanchō branch services. All trains are based at Koishikawa and Nakano Depots.

A fleet of 53 new Tokyo Metro 2000 series six-car trains was scheduled to be introduced from fiscal 2018, replacing the 02 series trains by fiscal 2022.
On February 23, 2019, the 2000 series started operation.

Former
 TRTA 500 series/TRTA 300/TRTA 400 series/TRTA 500 series/TRTA 900 series  (from 1954 until 1996, later sold and exported for use on Line B of the Buenos Aires Underground)
 TRTA 100 series (from 1962 until 1968, transferred from Ginza Line, used for Hōnanchō branch only)
 TRTA 2000 series (from 1968 until 1981, used for Hōnanchō branch only)

History

 
The Marunouchi Line is the second subway line to be built in the city, and the first to be constructed after the Second World War. Its design is similar to that of the Ginza Line, the oldest subway line in Tokyo. Both lines are standard gauge and use third rail power, unlike subsequent Tokyo subway lines which use overhead wires and are mostly narrow gauge to accommodate through services with other railway lines.

In a 1925 plan for a five-line subway system, the Marunouchi Line was planned to run from Shinjuku to Ōtsuka via Hibiya, Tsukiji and Okachimachi, as a  underground route. A  segment between Akasaka-mitsuke and Yotsuya began construction in 1942, but was abandoned in 1944 as a result of the continuing effects of World War II. On March 30, 1951, a groundbreaking ceremony was held at Ikebukuro Station East Exit to begin construction of the initial  segment of the Marunouchi Line.

The first section was opened between Ikebukuro and Ochanomizu on January 20, 1954. The subsequent progress of the line was as follows:
Ochanomizu to Awajichō: March 1956
Awajichō to Tokyo: July 1956
Tokyo to Nishi-Ginza (now Ginza): December 1957
Nishi-Ginza to Kasumigaseki: October 1958
Kasumigaseki to Shinjuku: March 1959
Shinjuku to Shin-Nakano/Nakano-Fujimichō (not Nishi-Shinjuku): February 1961
Shin-Nakano to Minami-Asagaya (not Higashi-Kōenji): November 1961
Minami-Asagaya to Ogikubo: January 23, 1962
Nakano-Fujimichō to Hōnanchō: March 23, 1962
Nishi-Ginza becomes part of Ginza when Hibiya Line reaches there: August 1964
Higashi-Kōenji opens (between Shin-Nakano and Shin-Kōenji): September 1964
Nishi-Shinjuku opens (between Shinjuku and Nakano-Sakaue) May 1996.

The Marunouchi Line was one of the lines targeted in the Aum sarin gas attack on March 20, 1995. A plan to extend the Marunouchi Line from Ogikubo to Asaka City in Saitama Prefecture was rejected in the late 1990s.

The line, stations, rolling stock, and related facilities were inherited by Tokyo Metro after the privatization of the Teito Rapid Transit Authority (TRTA) in 2004.

This was followed by Train automatic stopping controller (TASC) which was introduced in November 2002, along with Automatic train operation (ATO) which was introduced on the main segment of the Marunouchi Line on December 27, 2008. The platform-edge doors at Hōnanchō Station, the terminus of the Hōnanchō Branch, were lengthened to allow six-car trains to use the station, with work starting in 2013, which enabled through trains to and from Ikebukuro to start operating all the way to Hōnanchō from fiscal 2017.

Future plans
Communications-based train control (CBTC) signalling is also scheduled to be introduced together with the new rolling stock from 2022.

References

 Shaw, Dennis and Morioka, Hisashi, "Tokyo Subways", published 1992 by Hoikusha Publishing

External links

 Tokyo Metro website

 
Marunouchi Line
Railway lines in Tokyo
Railway lines opened in 1954
Standard gauge railways in Japan
1954 establishments in Japan
600 V DC railway electrification